The Peugeot 309 is a small family car that was manufactured between 1985 and 1994 in England, Spain and France by PSA Peugeot Citroën. It was originally intended to be badged as a Talbot and, as development progressed, to be called the Talbot Arizona.

It was the replacement for the Talbot Horizon, which had started life as a Chrysler in Britain and a Simca in France, and was also being built in several guises for the market in America. In 1985, the PSA Group decided to discontinue the Talbot brand, with the last passenger vehicle branded as a Talbot to be launched being the Samba of 1981, and to market the car as a Peugeot instead.

The Talbot brand was phased out completely when Talbot Express production stopped in 1994.

History 

The 309 had been conceived as Projet C28 as a replacement for the Talbot Horizon, and as a result its development had been performed by the former Chrysler/Simca wing of PSA. Styling was the responsibility of the former Chrysler-Rootes design studios in Coventry, whilst much of the engineering was done at the Simca site at Poissy in France.

The only stipulation from PSA management was that the new car had to use as much existing architecture as possible; hence the use of a stretched Peugeot 205 floorpan and door shells, whilst the Simca engines and transmissions from the Horizon were also carried over.

The 309's design was presaged by the 1982 Peugeot VERA Plus (followed by the VERA Profil in 1985), which were aerodynamic studies developed by Peugeot at the time. The VERA Plus claimed a Cw of only 0.22. Many of the aerodynamic features from the VERA studies found their way into later production Peugeots.

Production in France began at the former Simca plant in Poissy in the end of summer 1985, with the first French customers getting their cars in October of that year; but it was decided that RHD models would be built at the Ryton plant near Coventry, which had previously been owned by the Rootes Group and then Chrysler Europe before Peugeot took it over in 1978.

The first 309 for the British market rolled off the production line at Ryton in October 1985, and sales began the beginning of 1986, although left-hand drive sales of the Poissy built models began in France in October 1985. The only bodywork available originally was the five-door hatchback.

The 309 was not intended to replace Peugeot's own model, the 305, but the out of step model number (the next small family car after the 305 should have been named "306" which eventually launched in 1993) was intended to distance it from the larger 305 in the marketplace and to reflect the car's Simca origins. It was also the first Peugeot badged hatchback of this size. With the Talbot brand being phased out on passenger cars, the 309 would succeed the Talbot Horizon. Peugeot had been considering a new Talbot Samba based on the forthcoming Citroën AX supermini, but the success of the Peugeot 205 meant that there was little need for a third supermini within the PSA combine, and so the Samba was discontinued in 1986 with no replacement. The larger Alpine hatchback and Solara saloons were also axed in 1986, a year before Peugeot began production of the similar sized 405, successor to the 305.

The 309's slightly awkward styling (especially when compared with the 205 and 405 of the same era) was due to the decision to reuse the door shells from the 205. The 309 was also originally intended to be differentiated from Peugeot as a Talbot, and was designed "inhouse". Other Peugeot cars of the time were designed by the famed Italian design house Pininfarina, up until the introduction of the 206 in 1998. The notched hatchback design, commonly called as a liftback design, bears an unintentional similarity to the Dodge Shadow and Plymouth Sundance, which were also developed (entirely separately and cut down from a larger [Chrysler K-Car] platform rather than stretched from a smaller one) to replace the Horizon in North America.

The initial engine line up in the United Kingdom market consisted of the chain driven Simca derived 1118 cc (E1A) and 1294 cc (G1A) overhead valve petrol units from the Horizon, and Peugeot provided 1580/1905 cc petrol belt driven overhead camshaft XU units. Spanish-built cars also used the 1442 cc (Y2) and 1592 cc (J2) "Poissy engine", as seen previously in the Simca 1307 and Solara as well as the Horizon, instead of the 1580 cc OHC.

In July 1986 the first diesels arrived, the 1905 cc,  PSA XUD engined GLD, GRD, followed by the SRD in 1987. Certain export markets also received a  1769-cc version of this engine from the beginning. In France, the smaller diesel option only arrived in 1992. With 305 sales dropping considerably, the 309 range was expanded considerably in February 1987, when the three-door bodystyle was added. In line with Peugeot's naming policy of the time, five-door models generally have equipment levels beginning with the letter G, while three-doors begin with the letter X. Other important new models was the XU 1905 cc-engined high performance GTi version of the 309 using the same 1905 cc XU9 engine as found in the 205 GTi. Other new versions in 1987 were the new Automatic (only with five doors) and the XA and XAD two-seater vans which arrived in February.

As of September 2022, 41 Peugeot 309 GTis remained on the roads in the United Kingdom, with another 313 registered being kept off the road as SORN. The 309 was also significant in that it was the first Peugeot car to be assembled in the former Rootes factory in Ryton-on-Dunsmore, which Peugeot had inherited with its buyout of Chrysler Europe in 1978.

Largely due to its partially British origins, the Peugeot 309 became a popular choice in the United Kingdom, and in 1987, it was joined on the production line by the larger 405. The 309's successor, the 306, was also built at Ryton, as was the 206, which was the last vehicle in production there when the plant closed in December 2006.

Facelift (Phase 2) 

The summer of 1989 saw the introduction of the Phase 2 Peugeot 309. It revised the design of the rear, lowering the boot lip, changing the rear lights to a more 'smoked style' and making slight alterations to the front radiator grille.

Also, an updated interior was required to address severe criticisms leveled at the Phase 1's, Talbot-designed multi-piece dashboard which was prone to developing squeaks and rattles. The GTi models received a colour-coded, one-piece rear spoiler as opposed to the Phase 1's outdated rubber spoiler which, by then, harked back to early 1980s design practice.

Quite importantly a modified gearbox called 'BE3' was introduced, a revision of the original 'BE1' unit, placing reverse in the "down and to the right" position behind fifth gear, as opposed to the earlier "up and to the left" position next to first gear. Retrospectively, the 'BE3' gearboxes are slightly less prone to failure than their earlier counterparts.

This was also when Peugeot gradually phased in their, all new, belt driven TU Series overhead camshaft engines, in 1,124 cc and 1,360 cc forms, eventually replacing the trusty Simca units during 1992. The GTi 16 model, featuring the XU9J4 engine from the 405 Mi16, was also introduced at this time; however, these were only sold in mainland Europe. (See Trim Levels)

End of production 
Towards the end of 1992, production of the 309 began to wind down in anticipation for the launch of the new Peugeot 306, returning Peugeot to their normal numbering scheme. In July 1993, the 309 lineup was severely reduced and only the two Vital (petrol or diesel) models remained on sale until December. In total, 1,635,132 Peugeot 309s were built between 1985 and 1993.

As of 2018, only 481 Peugeot 309s remained on the roads in the United Kingdom, with another 1,378 registered being kept off the road as SORN.

India
India's Premier Automobiles Limited (PAL) began local assembly of the long mothballed 309 in 1995, only with five-door bodywork. Originally available only as a petrol-engined GL model powered by the TU3 engine, waitlisted buyers for the GL received the option to choose a diesel engine (GLD) instead, beginning in 1997. Labour and servicing issues were hindering the car in the marketplace, and after Premier formed a second joint venture with Fiat, Peugeot announced the end of their partnership with PAL in November 1997 with the sales of the 309 continuing up to 1998.

Trim levels 

 XE, GE: 1118cc E1A or 1294cc G1A OHV Simca engine, X with three doors and G with five doors. The 1118 cc engine came with a four speed gearbox, whilst the 1294 cc came with a five speed gearbox. Standard equipment was sparse, featuring a rear bench seat, heated rear window, small wheel centre wheel covers, as well as a flick wipe facility. Options included a rear wash/wipe, side bump strips on the doors, and a pop up sunroof.

Many special editions were based on the X/GE, such as the Sport model, which came with a spoiler and side decals; and also the Sunseeker model, which came with a pop up sunroof, and side decals. In some markets a diesel E model was also available, using the 1905 cc XUD engine. All diesel models carry the D suffix on the model badge (XLD, GLD).

The Special Equipment model available in the United Kingdom in 1989 also added a pop up sunroof and a rear wash/wipe to the standard equipment list. The E designation was replaced by the Style designation, which began as a special edition in 1987, but became a part of the range from 1988, to denote the base model, in line with other contemporary Peugeot models of the time (e.g. the Peugeot 205 Style and the Peugeot 405 Style). The Style was also available with the 1124 cc and 1360 cc TU and 1905 cc XUD (Style D) engines, all with five speed gearboxes, after the Simca units were phased out.

 XL, GL: 1294 cc G1A, 1580 cc XU5, and 1905 cc XUD engines (with D suffix), all with five speed gearboxes, X with three doors and G with 5. The L model was available throughout the 309's production, varying differently from early to late cars. The early cars came with some standard features, such as better seat coverings than the E model, a clock on the dashboard, door bump strips, intermittent wipe, a glovebox door (as opposed to the X/GE's glovebox hole), 50/50 split/fold rear seats, full size wheel covers and a rear wash/wipe.

A three speed automatic option was available with the XU5 engined GL. Later in the production run, the XL model was dropped, and a 1769 cc XUD turbo diesel engine was added to the L range, to become GLDTurbo, which featured alloy wheels (from the Peugeot 205 1.6 GTI), uprated GTI specification suspension, and a pair of front fog lights. Options on this also included central locking, electric front windows and the Peugeot vacuum operated moonroof, essentially a large glass sliding sunroof.

 GLX: 1294 cc G1A, 1360 cc TU3, and 1580 cc XU5 engines, all with five speed gearboxes and all with five doors. Standard equipment includes a digital clock, a tachometer, a sliding glass moonroof, sports style seats (similar to those fitted to the 205 XS), rear wash/wipe, door bump strips, intermittent wipe, and a small boot spoiler. The 1.6 model also added central locking and front electric windows to the list.

Post facelift 1.3 models and the 1.4 model also have central locking. Curiously, if the GLX was ordered in white, and later burgundy red, the bumpers were body coloured, with a contrasting trim strip, red with the white bumpers and silver with the burgundy ones. After the facelift the bumpers also gained a pair of fog lights. A reflective strip panel was also on the options list, that replaced the louvred panel that sits between the rear lights.

 GR Profile: 1294cc G1A, five doors. Intended as competition for such cars as the Austin Maestro HLE, the GR Profile used exactly the same G1A engine as the lower models in the range, but combined it with subtle aerodynamic improvements and lower rolling resistance tyres to reduce the drag coefficient of the car, with the brochure claiming a fuel economy improvement of three miles per gallon at a constant . The standard equipment list included an instrument lighting rheostat, a digital clock, an engine compartment undershield, a glovebox lamp, a carpeted boot and a boot light. Options included metallic paint, central locking, and electric windows. It was discontinued sometime in 1988, at about the time of the introduction of the GLX.
 XR, GR: 1580cc XU5, and 1905cc XUD engines, XR three door, GR five door. Much the same as the GR Profile in specification, with much the same standard features, and options. Was available later with the  fuel injected XU5 engine, and also a detuned  version, badged GRi, to address the problems Peugeot had with the XU engine and 95 octane fuels. Later in the run, a 1769 cc XUD turbo diesel model was also added, to become the GRDTurbo. This came with all the features as the GLDTurbo, and also added the features on the options list as standard. The XR was unavailable in the United Kingdom.

Specifications varied somewhat depending on the market.
 SR, SRD, SR Injection: 1580 cc XU5, and 1905 cc XUD engines, all with five doors. The SR model was intended to top the range, along with the GR. The SR used the  tune single carb XU5, the SRD used the  XUD9, and the SR Injection used the  XU5 from the 205 GTI 1.6. Equipment levels as standard were much the same as the GR, with the addition of central locking, internally adjustable headlights, a map reading light, electric windows in the front, Windsor velour seat trim and fibre-optic dashboard dials.

The SR Injection, in addition, added alloy wheels, remote controlled central locking, and remote controlled heated door mirrors. The options list included metallic/black paint, front fog lights, a sliding glass sunroof, an automatic gearbox (SR only), and SR decals on the rear flanks. These were only built in Phase 1 guise and many enthusiasts say that the SR was a better balanced car to drive than the GTI, however, they now also very rare.

 XS and SX: 1580cc XU5, three door version was designated XS and the five door version SX. Marketed as a sporty model, to complement the GTI, with the  XU5 injection engine. Was a little more basic than the SR models, to enhance the sporty feel, and made do without such things as luxury seats, instead having the tweed sports seats from the Peugeot 205 XS. In some markets, such as Sweden and Switzerland, the XS was fitted with the XU9M, a lower tuned version of the GTi's 1.9-liter engine producing .

It also came with opening rear windows (three door), a digital clock, a black spoiler (painted spoiler from the GTI after the facelift), driving lamps and a load area lamp. Options included alloy wheels, central locking/electric windows (only available as a twinned options pack), a sliding glass sunroof and front fog lights. The 309 XS is now very rare in the United Kingdom. The SX model was not available in the United Kingdom.

 GTI: 1905 cc XU9, three and five door.

The GTI came with some features unique to the range, such as the large black boot spoiler, driving lights and fog lights in the front bumper, remote opening rear windows (three door only), and the Speedline 1.9GTI alloys, the first car to be fitted with them. Also benefitted from uprated suspension, tinted glass, a deep front airdam, a leather steering wheel and internally adjustable headlights. Items on the options list included central locking/electric windows (as part of a twinned options pack), a sliding glass sunroof, and metallic/black paint.

 GTI16, A late addition to the range and only produced for a limited period. It featured the PSA XU engine XU9J4  16V 1.9 alloy engine from the 405 Mi16/Citroën BX 16V. It also included slightly uprated suspension (stiffer rear torsion bars, and wider track width both front and rear). The GTI16 was produced in LHD only as right-hand drive would have required modifications to allow the master cylinder to clear the exhaust header. With UK sales of the 309 GTI running at only around 1,000 per year (one tenth of 205 GTI sales), Peugeot UK chose not to import it. The very high power-to-weight ratio (160PS / 975 kg) resulted in a highly responsive drive, even by modern standards.
 XA, XAD, three-door van models with minimal equipment and no rear seats. These were introduced in February 1987.

Some notable limited edition models included:

The Zest/Zest D and the Trio/Trio D editions, with 1124/1360 cc TU engines and 1905 cc XUD engines, with unique seat fabric, green seatbelts and side decals down both flanks.

The Look, available in blue, white, and very scarce black were fitted with unique seat fabric with a sunroof and coloured bumper inserts.

The Goodwood, Limited Edition for the United Kingdom was a GTI with full black leather interior as standard, and no cost optional wooden steering wheel, gearknob and CD Autochanger. The 309 Goodwood was only available in limited numbers for the United Kingdom (only 398 vehicles were constructed) in metallic pinewood green with anthracite Speedline alloy wheels, with a polished metal lip on the outer rim and badging depicting the Goodwood racing circuit on the front wings, tailgate and steering wheel boss. When the Goodwood was launched, the high asking price resulted in some examples not finding homes until 1994, hence some being registered on an 'L' prefix registration.

Models
The models listed below are for the French domestic market.

References

309
Compact cars
Front-wheel-drive vehicles
Hatchbacks
Cars introduced in 1985
1990s cars
Cars discontinued in 1994